La Carte d'identité is a novel by Ivorian author Jean-Marie Adiaffi. It won the Grand prix littéraire d'Afrique noire in 1981.

References 

Ivorian novels
1980 novels
French-language novels
Grand prix littéraire d'Afrique noire winners